Sir Herbert Croft, 1st Baronet ( – 3 November 1720) was a British politician.

Family
Croft was the only son of the Right Reverend Herbert Croft, Bishop of Hereford and Anne Browne, the only daughter of the Very Rev. Dr. Jonathan Browne and Anne Barne Lovelace. Her half-brothers were Richard Lovelace (1618–1657) an English poet in the seventeenth century and Francis Lovelace (1621–1675), who was the second governor of the New York Colony appointed by James, Duke of York (later King James II).

The great nephew of both George Sandys (2 March 1577 – March 1644), the traveller, colonist and poet, and of Sir Edwin Sandys (9 December 1561 – October 1629), an English statesman and one of the founders of the London Company, he was also the great great grandson of Cicely Wilford and the Most Reverend Dr. Edwin Sandys, an Anglican church leader who successively held the posts of the Bishop of Worcester (1559–1570), Bishop of London (1570–1576), and the Archbishop of York (1576–1588), one of the translators of the Bishops' Bible.

Life
Croft matriculated at Magdalen College, Oxford in April 1668, and entered the Middle Temple in the same year.

Sir Herbert was created a baronet in 1671, and served as member of Parliament for Herefordshire in 1679 and 1690 to 1698. He was appointed High Sheriff of Herefordshire in 1682.

He inherited Croft Castle from his father in 1691.

He married Elizabeth, daughter of Thomas Archer of Umberslade, Warwickshire, by whom he had two sons: Archer, his successor and Francis, the grandfather of the 5th and 6th baronets.

He is buried at the Parish Church of St. Michael, Croft.

References
Burke's Peerage and Baronetage

1650s births
1720 deaths
Alumni of Magdalen College, Oxford
Baronets in the Baronetage of England
High Sheriffs of Herefordshire
English MPs 1679
English MPs 1690–1695
English MPs 1695–1698